Norman George Robertson Mair (7 October 1928 – 7 December 2014) was a Scottish international rugby union and cricket player. He later became a journalist for The Scotsman reporting on rugby and golf, and also wrote for Rugby World.

Life

Mair was born 7 October 1928 in Edinburgh, the youngest of the 11 surviving children of Elizabeth Mackay Bisset (1882-1950) and Alexander William Mair (1875-1928), professor of Greek at the University of Edinburgh. On 13 November 1928 his father died in a fire at the family home, 9 Corennie Drive, Morningside, Edinburgh.

He was educated at Merchiston Castle School (1942-1947).

Rugby Union

He studied at the University of Edinburgh where he played for Edinburgh University RFC.

He was selected for the provincial Edinburgh District side and played in the Scottish Inter-District Championship. He won the title with Edinburgh in the inaugural 1953-54 season and was the championship's top points scorer of that season.

He won four caps for the  national rugby union team in 1951.

He was inducted to the Scottish Rugby Hall of Fame in 2013.

Cricket

He also played for the Scotland national cricket team.

Mair played for Scotland in 1952. He was capped once, playing against Worcestershire. He scored four not out in his only innings.

Sports journalism

Bill McLaren rated Mair as one of the best rugby journalists that Scotland produced:
"I always have had a high regard for the coverage by Norman Mair, formerly of The Scotsman.

"Norman never was persona grata with all members of the Scottish Rugby Union because he wrote what he felt and had the ear of some very influential people in the game. There have been times when I have had to read one of Norman's sentences two or three times over in order to get the gist, but he has been one of the most perceptive of analysts and his articles have been both enlightening and enjoyable - especially the little humorous stories that were so often his punchlines."

Writing of the Australian player Mark Ella, he once said:
"Ella has hands so adhesive that when he fumbled a ball against  (in 1984) you would not have been surprised to see those Australians of the appropriate religious persuasion cross themselves"

Mair was always outspoken in his opinions. In the early fifties, for example, criticising the large number of new caps in each game in 1953 and 1954, he said that he consider the "inhabitants of lunatic asylums... had a fair grievance while the S.R.U. selectors walked around free and uncertified."

He died at Thorburn Manor Care Home in Colinton.

Family
His daughter is Suzi Mair, who produces STV News at Six.

Selected publications
 Mair, Norman, 1994,  Muirfield, Mainstream Publishing
 John Rutherford and Roy Laidlaw with Norman Mair, Rugby Partnership: Stanley Paul, 1988.

Bibliography
 Bath, Richard (ed.) The Scotland Rugby Miscellany (Vision Sports Publishing Ltd, 2007 )
 McLaren, Bill Talking of Rugby (1991, Stanley Paul, London )
 Massie, Allan A Portrait of Scottish Rugby (Polygon, Edinburgh)

References

External links
 SRU Profile
 The Scotsman obituary
 

1928 births
2014 deaths
Alumni of the University of Edinburgh
People educated at Merchiston Castle School
Edinburgh University RFC players
Scottish rugby union players
Scotland international rugby union players
Scottish cricketers
Scottish journalists
Cricketers from Edinburgh
Rugby union journalists
Edinburgh District (rugby union) players
Rugby union players from Edinburgh
Rugby union hookers